Jiǎ is a surname. Chia is the corresponding Wade-Giles romanization, which is commonly used in Taiwan. Ka is the corresponding Cantonese-based romanization, which is  used in Hong Kong and other Cantonese-speaking regions.

Notable people with Jia as a surname

Historical figures
 Jia Yi (賈誼; 200–169 BCE), official of the Han dynasty
 Jia Kui (scholar) (賈逵; 30–101), scholar and astronomer of the Eastern Han dynasty
 Jia Xu (賈詡; 147–223), official of the Cao Wei state
 Jia Kui (general) (賈逵; 174–228), general of Cao Wei state
 Jia Chong (賈充; 217–282), general of the Jin dynasty
 Jia Nanfeng (賈南風; 257–300), empress of the Jin dynasty
 Huiyuan (慧遠; 334–416), Buddhist teacher of the Jin dynasty
 Jia Dan (賈耽; 730–805), official of the Tang dynasty
 Jia Dao (賈島; 779–843), poet of the Tang dynasty
 Jia Su (賈餗; died 835), official of the Tang dynasty
 Jia Xian (贾宪; 1010–1070), mathematician of the Song dynasty
 Jia Sidao (賈似道; 1213–1275), grand chancellor of the Southern Song dynasty under Emperor Lizong

Film and television
 Jia Zhangke (贾樟柯; born 1970), Chinese film director
 Jia Hongsheng (贾宏声; 1967–2010), Chinese actor
 Alyssa Chia (賈靜雯; born 1974), Taiwanese actress
 JJ Jia (賈曉晨; born 1982), Chinese actress
 Jia Nailiang (born 1984), Chinese actor

Government and politics
 Chia Ching-teh (1880–1960), President of the Republic of China Examination Yuan (1952–1954)
 Jia Deyao (賈德耀; 1880–1940), Republic of China general and politician
 Jia Zhijie (贾志杰; born 1935), Chinese politician, governor of Gansu and Hubei
 Jia Chunwang (贾春旺; born 1938), Chinese official of the Supreme People's Procurator
 Jia Qinglin (贾庆林; born 1940), Chinese politician, member of the Politburo Standing Committee
 Jia Zhibang (贾治邦; born 1946), Chinese official of the State Forestry Administration
 Jia Yongsheng (贾永生; born 1947), People's Liberation Army Air Force general
 Jia Ting'an (贾廷安; born 1952), People's Liberation Army General Political Department general
 Jia Gaojian (贾高建; born 1959), Chinese official of the Central Compilation and Translation Bureau

Sport
 Jia Lianren (1912–?), Chinese middle distance runner
 Jia Xiuquan (贾秀全; born 1963), Chinese football manager
 Jia Guihua (born 1964), Chinese fencer
 Jia Zhanbo (贾占波; born 1974), Chinese sport shooter
 Jia Wenpeng (贾文鹏; born 1978), Chinese football midfielder
 Jia Xiaozhong (贾孝忠; born 1980), Chinese basketball player
 Jia Yunbing (born 1981), Chinese judo practitioner
 Jia Dandan (贾丹丹; born 1982), Chinese ice hockey player
 Jia Yubing (贾昱冰; born 1983), Chinese baseball player
 Jia Delong (贾德龙; born 1985), Chinese baseball player
 Jia Juntingxian (born 1986), Chinese Paralympic sprinter
 Jia Yuping (born 1986), Chinese cross-country skier
 Jia Tong (贾童; born 1991), Chinese diver
 Jia Zongyang (贾宗洋; born 1991), Chinese aerial skier
 Jia Tianzi (贾天子; born 1994), Chinese football midfielder
 Jia Yifan (贾一凡; born 1997), Chinese badminton player

Other
 Jia Lanpo (贾兰坡; 1908–2001), Chinese archaeologist
 Jia Pingwa (贾平娃; born 1952), Chinese writer
 Jia Yueting (贾跃亭; born 1973), Chinese businessman, founder of Le.com
 Jia Ling (贾玲; born 1982), Chinese xiangsheng performer
 Jia Jinglong (贾敬龙; 1986–2016), Chinese protester, executed for murder
 Jia Hongguang (born 1988), Chinese Paralympic swimmer
 Jia Junpeng (贾君鹏), Chinese man whose name became associated with a 2009 internet meme
 Jia Rongqing (贾荣庆), Chinese-born Canadian mathematician
 Jia Ruhan (贾茹涵), Chinese soprano
 Xiaohua Jia, Chinese electrical engineer

Fictional characters
Characters in Dream of the Red Chamber:
 Jia Baoyu (賈寶玉), principal character
 Jia Xichun (賈惜春), third cousin of Jia Baoyu
 Jia Tanchun (賈探春), half-sister of Jia Baoyu
 Jia Qiaojie (賈巧姐), daughter of Jia Lian

Chinese-language surnames
Individual Chinese surnames